The Hasselblad Foundation (in full: Erna and Victor Hasselblad Foundation), was established in 1979 at the will of Victor Hasselblad, as a fully independent, not-for-profit foundation based at Götaplatsen in Gothenburg, Sweden. The main aim of the Foundation is to promote research and academic teaching in the natural sciences and photography.

History 

After the death of Victor Hasselblad in August 1978 it was announced by the Swedish government that he had bequeathed part of his fortune "to establish awards similar to Nobel prizes," with the Erna and Victor Hasselblad Foundation "awarding prizes of around three million Swedish crowns ($700,000) once a year, or twice this sum every two years, to scientists in the natural sciences." At the time the sum corresponded to the annual Nobel prize awards for science and literature. The first grant, 500,000 Swedish Kronor in that instance, went to Sweden's Royal Institute of Technology's Department of Photography, then the country's only  scientific research and teaching institution in the field of photography.

Erna and Victor Hasselblad Photography Center 
In accord with its origin in the manufacture of innovative cameras, the Foundation also conducts its own research into photography at its Hasselblad Center, which opened in 1989, with Rune Hassner as the organisation's first head 1988-94, and it continues to exhibit Swedish and International photography. On Hassner's initiative the Center commenced a collection with a concentration on the work of Nordic photographers, among them Sune Jonsson, Christer Strömholm, Adriana Lestido, Pal-Nils Nilsson.

The Center's purpose is to promote education in photography through research projects, seminars and lectures, and its library and archives for students and researchers. The Hasselblad Foundation’s research library opened in 1999, initiated with Hassner's own extensive library wihch he donated in 1998.

Among these actives American ornithologist-photographer Don Walte in 1988 was granted $21.000 Foundation to photograph birds with a video camera sharing a viewfinder with the Hasselblad camera, opening a new career as a film maker.

Hasselblad Foundation International Award in Photography 
The Foundation also presents an annual international award in photography to “a photographer recognised for major achievements”, exhibiting their work at the Center and publishing monographs on each.

The first prize, 100,000 Swedish Kronor and a gold medal, was awarded in November 1980 to Lennart Nilsson for his imagery of medicine and nature. Other winners included Ernst Haas, Edouard Boubat, Manuel Alvarez Bravo, Robert Häusser, Henri Cartier-Bresson, Hiroshi Hamaya, William Klein, Sebastiao Salgado, Susan Meiselas, and Boris Mikhailov.

Photography stipends

The Victor Fellowships

Awards continuous professional and artistic development outside the Nordic region since 2004. Two stipend winners are announced annually, one from United Kingdom and another one from New York.

The Grez-sur-Loing stipend

Awards Scandinavian photographers, or Scandinavians working abroad, with a residency located in Grez-sur-Loing near Fontainebleau, France. The awarded photographer is accommodated at the Hôtel Chevillon, restored by the Grez-sur-Loing Foundation. The Grez-sur-Loing stipends have been awarded since 1994.

The San Michele stipend

Targeting Swedish photographers, the winner of this stipend will follow in the footsteps of Swedish physician Axel Munthe, awarded with an international stay at Axel Munthe's Villa San Michele located on Capri, an island in the southern part of Italy.

Stipend in Nature Photography

A stipend established to encourage Nordic nature photography, based on Victor Hasselblad's own interest in nature. In collaboration with Vårgårda Photo Club. First  to be awarded was Swedish photographer Marcus Elmerstad.

Postdoctor in photography

Science

Science grants

Visiting professorship

Science stipends

See also
Hasselblad Masters Award
Hasselblad Award

References

External links

Photography foundations
Scientific research foundations
Swedish photography organizations
1979 establishments by country
Photography organizations by country